Finn Willy Sørensen (9 May 1941 – 23 March 2019) was a Danish football player and manager, who later became a real estate agent. Sørensen started his career with Frem, before moving abroad to play with Washington Whips in the United States, and a number of Swedish clubs. Sørense was head coach for BK Fremad Amager from August 1981 until December 1984.

References

External links
Danish national team profile
 Boldklubben Frem profile
NASL stats

1941 births
2019 deaths
Footballers from Copenhagen
Danish men's footballers
Danish expatriate men's footballers
Boldklubben Frem players
Danish football managers
Landskrona BoIS managers
Boldklubben Frem managers
Washington Whips players
North American Soccer League (1968–1984) players
Expatriate soccer players in the United States
Association football defenders
Fremad Amager managers